, sometimes written as Micro Cabin, is a Japan-based video game developer and publisher incorporated in 1982, which grew from the Ōyachi Electrics Microcomputer Club.

Known for their Xak series and its spinoff Fray in Magical Adventure, and games such as Illusion City and Mystaria: The Realms of Lore. Other games include Mystery House, Guardian War, and the Koutetsu no Houkou series.

They also developed the Sega Saturn port of Tunnel B1.

History
On 2008-05-09, AQ Interactive, Inc. announced the acquisition of Microcabin Corporation via share purchase, with trade on 2008-05-16.

On 2011-01-14, AQ Interactive, Inc. announced selling its 85% stake (312704 shares) of Microcabin Corporation to Fields Corporation (フィールズ株式会社), and Microcabin Corporation became a consolidated subsidiary of Fields Corporation.

Subsidiary

Former subsidiaries
Neuron Image (（株）ニューロン イメージ): In 2002–01, Microcabin Entertainment (（株）マイクロキャビンエンタテイメント) was renamed to Neuron Image (（株）ニューロン イメージ). In 2008–09, Neuron Image was merged into Microcabin Corp.

References

External links
 Microcabin Homepage
 Moby Games
 GameSpy

Video game companies established in 1982
1982 establishments in Japan